Mohammad Harij Uddin Sarker is a politician from the Rangpur District of Bangladesh and an elected a member of parliament from Rangpur-5.

Career 
Chowdhury was elected to parliament from Rangpur-5 as an  independent candidate in 1988.

References 

Living people
Year of birth missing (living people)
Possibly living people
People from Rangpur District
Jatiya Party politicians
4th Jatiya Sangsad members